Eldorado Valley, or El Dorado Valley, is a Great Basin valley in the Mojave Desert southeast of Las Vegas and southwest of Boulder City, Nevada. The valley is endorheic, containing the Eldorado Dry Lake. The Great Basin Divide, transects ridgelines and saddles, on the north, northeast, east, and south around the valley, as the valley sits on the east of the McCullough Range, a Great Basin massif, on the Great Basin Divide at its north terminus and its south terminus.

Geography
The north end of the valley contains a large salt pan, or dry lake, Dry Lake or Eldorado Playa, while the southern two thirds drains northwards.  U.S. Route 95 traverses eastern portions of the valley, and climbs steeply to meet U.S. Route 93, connecting Boulder City to Henderson.

The endorheic basin lies north of the Piute Wash Watershed,  of the north-south Piute Valley. The  Piute Wash drains south, then southeast to the Colorado River.

Highland Range Crucial Bighorn Habitat
The southern valley includes a habitat nature reserve for the Desert Bighorn Sheep, named the 'Highland Range Crucial Bighorn Habitat'. There are no public access routes into the habitat area, to protect the Bighorn.

Solar power

The northern valley contains Boulder City's "Eldorado Energy Zone" which is home to the 480 MW El Dorado natural gas power plant completed in the year 2000. 
Since 2007,  it is also home to the concentrated solar power plant, Nevada Solar One, as well as a growing number of photovoltaic power stations, including:
 Copper Mountain Solar Facility
 Boulder Solar Project
 Techren Solar Project

References

External links
Las Vegas Wash Watershed; Havasu-Mohave Lakes Watershed
Eldorado Playa, Geomicrobiological Changes (coord)
Eldorado Dry Lake, Eldorado Valley Flyers.com-(elevation 1750ft)
(Eldorado Dry Lake), RiderPlanet-USA, riderplanet-usa.com (elevation) & Photo gallery

 
Endorheic basins of the United States
Valleys of the Mojave Desert
Valleys of Clark County, Nevada
Valleys of Nevada
Protected areas of the Mojave Desert